Mannan is a Dravidian language of Kerala and Tamil Nadu that is classified under the Malayalam languages.

References

Malayalam language